Swaab is the surname of the following people
Dick Swaab (born 1944), Dutch physician and neurobiologist 
Jacques Michael Swaab (1894–1963), American World War I flying ace 
John Swaab (born 1928), Dutch  Olympic equestrian 
Neil Swaab (born 1978), American artist, designer, writer, and educator
Ninna Swaab (born 1940), Swedish Olympic equestrian 
Reine Colaço Osorio-Swaab (1881–1971), Dutch composer